Sergei Lepmets (born 5 April 1987) is an Estonian retired professional footballer who last played as a goalkeeper for Meistriliiga club Nõmme Kalju.

Club career

TJK
Lepmets came through the TJK youth academy.

Merkuur
In 2004, Lepmets joined Merkuur Tartu. He made his debut in the Meistriliiga on 14 March 2004, in a 1–1 home draw against Kohtla-Järve FC Lootus.

Levadia
On 17 January 2006, Lepmets signed a three-year contract with Levadia in a deal which saw fellow goalkeeper Aleksandr Djatšenko heading in the opposite direction. As a second choice goalkeeper behind Martin Kaalma, he won three consecutive Meistriliiga titles between 2007 to 2009. Lepmets became a regular starter for Levadia in the 2010 season.

Politehnica Timișoara
On 1 February 2011, Lepmets joined Romanian club Politehnica Timișoara. The club finished the 2010–11 Liga I as runners-up, but were relegated to the Liga II due to unpaid debts. Following Costel Pantilimon's departure to Manchester City, Lepmets became the club's first-choice goalkeeper for the 2011–12 season.

Concordia Chiajna
In June 2012, Lepmets joined Liga I club Concordia Chiajna. He made his debut in the Liga I in a 0–1 away loss to Steaua București on 23 July 2012.

Ceahlăul Piatra Neamț
In January 2013, Lepmets joined Liga I club Ceahlăul Piatra Neamț on a four-year contract.

CSMS Iași
On 25 June 2013, Lepmets signed a three-year contract with Liga II club CSMS Iași.

Narva Trans
In August 2013, Lepmets returned to Estonia and trained with Infonet, before signing for Narva Trans.

FC Hämeenlinna
In July 2014, Lepmets left Narva Trans and signed for Finnish club FC Hämeenlinna.

Türi Ganvix
In September 2014, Lepmets returned to Estonia and joined II liiga club Türi Ganvix.

Return to Levadia
On 3 March 2016, Lepmets joined his former club Levadia.

International career
On 23 August 2012, Lepmets was called up to the Estonia national team for the first time, for 2014 FIFA World Cup qualification matches against Romania and Turkey.

He made his senior international debut for Estonia on 30 May 2018, in 2–0 win over Lithuania at the Baltic Cup.

Later career
In January 2021, Lepmets joined Nõmme Kalju FC, where he would function both as a goalkeeper and goalkeeper coach.

Honours

Club
FCI Levadia
Meistriliiga: 2007, 2008, 2009
Estonian Cup: 2006–07, 2009–10, 2017–18
Estonian Supercup: 2010, 2018

Politehnica Timișoara
Liga II: 2011–12

References

External links

1987 births
Living people
Footballers from Tallinn
Estonian people of Russian descent
Estonian footballers
Association football goalkeepers
Esiliiga players
FCI Levadia U21 players
Meistriliiga players
FCI Levadia Tallinn players
Liga II players
FC Politehnica Timișoara players
Liga I players
CS Concordia Chiajna players
CSM Ceahlăul Piatra Neamț players
FC Politehnica Iași (2010) players
JK Narva Trans players
Nõmme Kalju FC players
Kakkonen players
FC Hämeenlinna players
Estonia youth international footballers
Estonia international footballers
Estonian expatriate footballers
Expatriate footballers in Romania
Expatriate footballers in Finland
Estonian expatriate sportspeople in Romania
Estonian expatriate sportspeople in Finland
JK Maag Tartu players